The Mark of the Assassin is a 1998 spy fiction novel by Daniel Silva.

Synopsis
When a terrorist bomb blows Flight 002 out of the sky off the east coast, there is only one chilling clue. A body found near the crash site bears the deadly calling card of an elusive, lethal assassin - three bullets to the face. Michael Osbourne of the CIA knows the markings. Personally.

International titles
Portuguese: A Marca do Assassino. (The Mark of the Assassin). (2011).

References

1998 American novels
American spy novels
Novels by Daniel Silva